Cinema Asia Releasing is a film distribution company founded by Ko Mori of Eleven Arts and Tim Kwok of Convergence Entertainment in 2011 to spread Asian films throughout the United States.

Filmography 
 Heartbeat (Feature, Korea, 2010)
 Iris the Movie (Feature, Korea, 2010)
 Midnight FM (Feature, Korea, 2010)
 Evangelion: 2.0 You Can (Not) Advance (Animation, Japan, 2011)
 The Treasure Hunter (Feature, Taiwan, 2011)
 Mindfulness and Murder (Feature, Thailand)

References 

 "Animated Sequel Could Show on up to 100 Screens" The Hollywood Reporter. 2010/11/26
 "Mori, Kwok drive CAR into North American distribution" Screendaily. 2011/03/21
 "CAR drives into North America" Film Business Asia. 2011/03/21
 "Ko, Kwok start CAR" Variety. 2011/03/21

External links 
 
 Cinema Asia Releasing on IMDB

Film distributors of the United States